James Trimble may refer to:

James A. Trimble (1847–?), street car works, 218 East 28th St., New York
James Travis Trimble Jr. (born 1932), United States federal judge
James William Trimble (1894–1972), Member of the US House of Representatives
Jim Trimble, American college football coach
James Trimble (Canadian politician) (died 1885), Speaker of the British Columbia legislature
James Trimble III (1925–1945), baseball player and U.S. Marine